Howard–Odmin–Sherman Farmstead, also known as the Hidden Pond Farm, is a historic home and farm located at Pittstown, Rensselaer County, New York. The farmhouse was built about 1860, and consists of a two-story, three bay, frame dwelling with a one-story rear ell in a transitional Greek Revival / Italianate  style. Also on the property are the contributing carriage barn (c. 1840-1860), outbuilding (c. 1840-1860), grain house (c. 1840-1860), main barn (c. 1870), henhouse (c. 1940s), turkey coop (c. 1930), small outbuilding (c. 1900), and two pole barns (c. 1960).

It was listed on the National Register of Historic Places in 2014.

References

Farms on the National Register of Historic Places in New York (state)
Greek Revival houses in New York (state)
Italianate architecture in New York (state)
1840 establishments in New York (state)
Houses completed in 1840
Buildings and structures in Rensselaer County, New York
National Register of Historic Places in Rensselaer County, New York